Fabrizio Tassinari (b. 1977) is an Italian political scientist.   

Since 2017, he is the founding executive director of the School of Transnational Governance at the European University Institute, a flagship initiative of the European Commission.  

A recipient of a German government’s Alexander von Humboldt Foundation career award, he taught international relations at Humboldt University in Berlin from 2013 to 2017. Prior to that, Tassinari served as head of foreign policy studies at the Danish Institute for International Studies, the Danish government's independent research institution on foreign affairs, which he had joined as a senior researcher in 2009.    

After his doctorate, Tassinari was an assistant professor at the Department of Political Science of the University of Copenhagen and a research fellow at the Centre for European Policy Studies in Brussels.  

Among his advisory positions, he served as a senior transatlantic fellow at the German Marshall Fund of the United States, as a fellow at the Center for Transatlantic Relations of Johns Hopkins University School of Advanced International Studies, and an adjunct fellow at the Woodrow Wilson International Center for Scholars in Washington, DC. Since 2020, he is also a Berggruen Fellow at the Berggruen Institute in Los Angeles. Tassinari is a Council Member of the European Council on Foreign Relations.  

Tassinari graduated summa cum laude in political science from the University of Rome and earned his PhD in political science from the University of Copenhagen.

Research 
Tassinari has researched and published extensively on issues of international security, foreign policy analysis and comparative politics, with an empirical focus on the wider Europe and its surrounding regions. He is author or editor of 7 books and over 60 academic contributions as peer-reviewed journals articles, academic books and policy articles. His book Why Europe Fears its Neighbors (Praeger), analyses the sources and origins of Europe's threat perception, and also appeared in an updated Turkish-language edition for the mass market. His book, The Pursuit of Governance (Agenda), uses the case of Nordic governance to argue that the future of liberal democracy resides in a “middle way” between technocracy and populism. 

A regular columnist  on international affairs, Tassinari’s commentaries regularly appear in leading  international media. He has advised several Western governments and international organisations; his research on Black Sea cooperation provided the blueprint and the official name of the Black Sea Synergy, a European Union policy.

Selected bibliography 
 The Pursuit of Governance: Nordic Dispatches on a New Middle Way. Newcastle upon Tyne: Agenda Publishing. 2022.
 La Stella Polare: Dispacci dal Futuro del Buongoverno. Soveria Mannelli: Rubbettino. 2021.
 “A Tale of Two Pandemics”, NOEMA Magazine, November 2020.

References 

1977 births
Living people
Italian political scientists
Humboldt Research Award recipients
Sapienza University of Rome alumni
21st-century Italian writers
Italian male writers
University of Copenhagen alumni